Herpetogramma schausi is a moth in the family Crambidae. It was described by Eugene G. Munroe in 1995. It is found in Brazil.

References

Moths described in 1995
Herpetogramma
Moths of South America